Ashitaka may refer to:

 Prince Ashitaka, character from Princess Mononoke
 Mount Ashitaka, Mountain in Japan
 6961 Ashitaka, Asteroid
 Ashitaka Park Stadium, athletic stadium in Numazu